Moonyoonooka is a rural locality on the eastern margin of Geraldton, in the Mid West region of Western Australia. It contains Geraldton Airport. At the 2016 census, Moonyoonooka had a population of 245. Of employed people, 22.4% worked in the vegetable horticulture industry. Notably 9.1% of residents speak Vietnamese at home, eight times the national average.

Moonyoonooka is the site of Glengarry Homestead, the birthplace of Edith Cowan, the first Australian woman to serve as a member of parliament.

References

Mid West (Western Australia)